Bouba may refer to:

 Bouba/kiki effect, an observed neurophysiological effect tying certain sounds to specific shapes
 Bouba (TV series), a.k.a. Jacky and Jill, or Monarch: The Big Bear of Tallac, a Japanese anime television series in the late 1970s
 Yaws

See also
Buba (disambiguation)
Booba (born 1976), A French rapper
Boohbah, a British children's television programme